Karim Khan Zand Boulevard is a boulevard in central Shiraz, Iran connecting Valiasr Square to Namazi Square. It passes Shahrdari Square and Emam Hossein (Setad) Square.

Streets in Shiraz